Duck Creek is a perennial stream and a southern tributary of A'Becketts Creek and part of the Parramatta River catchment, in Sydney, New South Wales, Australia.

Geography 

Sections of its upper reaches in Guildford and Merrylands have been channelized and piped underground as it passes under roads, playing fields and through housing development. It then flows through the suburbs of Granville and Clyde where it joins with A'Becketts Creek.  In its lower reaches it is a tidal creek.

See also 

 Duck River
 Parramatta River
 Port Jackson

References 

Creeks and canals of Sydney
Parramatta River